The South African Railways Class  of 1974 is a diesel-electric locomotive.

Between 1974 and 1977, the state-owned South African Iron and Steel Corporation placed forty-four General Electric type U26C diesel-electric locomotives in service. They were employed on Iscor's 1974-built Sishen-Saldanha iron ore line and as heavy shunters at the Sishen mine. In 1977, another two locomotives were built for the Douglas Colliery near Witbank. Also in 1977, thirty-nine of the Iscor locomotives were transferred to the South African Railways where they were initially designated "Class  ex Iscor" and later became commonly known as Class .

Manufacturer
The Class  type GE U26C diesel-electric locomotive, also known as "Class  ex Iscor", was designed by General Electric and built for the South African Iron and Steel Corporation (Iscor) by the South African General Electric-Dorman Long Locomotive Group (later Dorbyl). Forty-four locomotives were delivered to Iscor on three orders:
 Twenty-two were delivered between 1974 and 1975, of which twenty were numbered in the range from 1D to 20D and geared for mainline service while two were numbered G01 and G02 and geared for shunting work.
 Twenty more were delivered between 1976 and 1977, numbered in the range from 21D to 40D and geared for mainline service.
 Another two were delivered in 1977, geared for shunting and numbered G03 and G04.

In 1977, two locomotives were also built for the Douglas Colliery near Witbank in Transvaal, numbered D5 and D6. Of the Iscor mainline locomotives, 39 were transferred to the South African Railways in that same year.

Distinguishing features
The Iscor locomotives were delivered with a  fuel tank to cope with the lack of en route refuelling points on the Sishen-Saldanha line. To facilitate the larger fuel tank, the inter-bogie linkage found on all other South African U26C models was omitted on these locomotives. To maintain its lateral balance, a slab of metal was attached to each bogie in place of the removed linkage.

As built, the GE Classes ,  and  locomotives were visually indistinguishable from each other. Many of the Class  locomotives could be distinguished from the others by the air conditioning units mounted on their cab roofs, but not all of them were so equipped. When it was still a feature unique to them, they could also be distinguished by their running board-mounted handrails. All South African diesel-electric locomotives have their side handrails mounted along the upper edges of their long hoods. The ex Iscor Class , however, were equipped with additional removable running board-mounted handrails. Since these handrails are slide-fit into brackets welded onto the running boards, they are easily removed.

Since c. 2009, other mainline diesel-electric locomotive types also emerged from the Koedoespoort Transwerk shops with running board-mounted handrails after major overhauls.

At some stage during the mid-1980s, all Class ,  and  locomotives had saddle filters installed across the long hood, mounted just to the rear of the screens behind the cab on the sides. Since then, Class  locomotives could be distinguished from the older models by the absence of the saddle filter.

Electronic control system
Beginning in 2010, some locomotives were equipped with electronic fuel injection and GE "Bright Star" control systems. On some of the first locomotives to be so modified, externally visible evidence of the modification is a raised middle portion of the long hood.

Service

Changes in ownership
In 1977, all mainline rail operations on the Sishen-Saldanha iron ore line was taken over from Iscor by the South African Railways (SAR). Between November 1977 and June 1978, 39 of the Iscor mainline locomotives were transferred to the SAR. They were initially designated "Class  ex Iscor" and renumbered in the range from 34-501 to 34-539, but these units were also commonly referred to as Class  from their SAR number range. This eventually became the accepted official classification.

Five locomotives were retained by Iscor to work at the Sishen mine, numbers G01 to G04 and 40D. These are now Kumba Iron Ore’s units numbers 01 to 05, with no. 40D having become Kumba no. 05.

The Douglas Colliery locomotives are now in Sheltam livery, initially as Sheltam numbers 5 and 6 and later renumbered to 2602 and 2603 respectively.

South African Railways service

While it is believed that they were for the most part renumbered from Iscor numbers to SAR numbers in sequence with their Iscor numbers, at least one locomotive has been observed as being out of sequence. No. 34-523 bore works plate no. 35265, identifying it as ex Iscor no. 5D. It can be presumed that no. 34-505 carried works plate GE 40402, which would make it ex Iscor no. 23D, but since the works plates have over time disappeared from most of these locomotives, this cannot be confirmed.

Until 2012, when they began to be replaced by new GE Class  type C30ACi locomotives, most of the Class  remained on the  Sishen–Saldanha Orex line to haul ore from the open cast iron mines at Sishen near Kathu in the Northern Cape to the harbour at Saldanha in the Western Cape. Some also ended up being allocated to other depots at times. During the 1980s several were observed working goods and passenger trains between Port Elizabeth and Bloemfontein and between Beaufort West and Kimberley, still clad in their Iscor livery.

Mixed power working
On the Orex line, the GE Class 34 family of diesel-electric locomotives ran consisted to Class 9E and Class 15E electric locomotives to haul the 342-wagon iron ore trains. In South Africa, mixed electric and diesel-electric consists are unique to the iron ore line.

A Class 9E or Class 15E electric locomotive serves as the master of each mixed electric and diesel-electric consist, with a total of between nine and twelve locomotives per train, twelve being the maximum number allowed. Before the Class 15E was placed in service in 2010, motive power usually consisted of three sets of locomotives, each set made up of one or two Class 9E electrics and one or two Class 34 diesel-electrics, with each set’s leading electric locomotive controlling its respective set of diesel-electrics by means of a slimkabel (smart cable). In effect, each ore train was made up of three separate 114-wagon trains consisted together with the locomotives of all three trains being controlled by means of a Locotrol radio distributed power control system by one crew in the leading electric locomotive. A typical train would therefore be made up of locomotive set A, 114 wagons, locomotive set B, 114 wagons, locomotive set C, and 114 wagons.

Some problems were experienced using this configuration and after a couple of major derailments, the locomotive configuration was changed to four sets, with locomotive set D initially made up of two Class 34 diesel-electric locomotives at the rear end of the train, pushing at between 40% and 50% of tractive power at all times, depending on the grades being traversed. The total maximum number allowed was still between nine and twelve locomotives per train.

Works numbers
The Class  builder’s works numbers, ownership changes and renumbering are listed in the table.

Liveries
The Class 34-500 were all delivered in an Iscor livery. After their transfer to the SAR, they were gradually repainted in the SAR Gulf Red livery with signal red buffer beams, yellow side stripes on the long hood sides and a yellow V on each end. In the 1990s some of the Class 34-500 units began to be repainted in the Spoornet orange livery with a yellow and blue chevron pattern on the buffer beams. At least one later received the Spoornet maroon livery. In the late 1990s most of them were repainted in the Spoornet blue livery with outline numbers on the long hood sides. After 2008 in the Transnet Freight Rail (TFR) era, many were repainted in the TFR red, green and yellow livery.

Illustration
The main picture shows no. 34-530 in Spoornet blue livery with outline numbers. Some of the other liveries applied to Class  locomotives are illustrated below.

References

3380
Co-Co locomotives
General Electric locomotives
Dorbyl locomotives
Cape gauge railway locomotives
Railway locomotives introduced in 1974
1974 in South Africa